This is a list of notable companies located in the state of Michigan.

Companies based in Michigan
*Note: this list includes joint-ventures based in Michigan, subsidiaries of Michigan-based companies also located in Michigan, and companies based in Michigan currently owned or controlled by private equity, venture capital, or other similar entities. Below is a separate list of outside companies with a significant presence in Michigan.

A
 ACD
 Acrisure
 Adient
 Airflow Sciences Corporation
 Ally Financial
 Alpena Power Company
 Altair Engineering
 Alticor
 American Axle
 American Seating
 Amway
 Amway North America
 Arcadia Brewing Company
 Art Van
 Asset Acceptance Capital Corp.
 Auto-Owners Insurance

B
 Bad Frog Beer
 Baker Publishing Group
 Bell's Brewery
 Belle Tire
 Better Made Potato Chips
 Big Boy Restaurants
 Biggby Coffee
 Bissell
 BorgWarner
 Borroughs
 Boyne Resorts
 Burns & Wilcox

C
 Carhartt
 Celebration Cinema
 Chrysler
 CMS Energy
 Coffee Beanery
 Compuware
 Consumers Energy
 Cooper-Standard Automotive
 Crain Communications
 CSA Air

D
 D&W Fresh Market
 Dark Horse Brewery
 Dart Container
 The Delfield Company
 Detroit Media Partnership
 Dickinson Wright
 Domino's Pizza
 Doner Company
 Dortch Enterprises
 Dow Chemical Company
 DTE Energy
 Dura Automotive Systems

F
 Fabri-Kal
 Faygo
 Federal-Mogul
 Flagstar Bank
 Ford & Ford Motor Credit Company
 Founders Brewing Company
 Franklin Cider Mill
 Frankenmuth Brewery

G
 Gemini Group
 General Motors
 Gentex
 Gilson Graphics
 Goodrich Quality Theaters
 Gordon Food Service
 Guardian Industries

H
 Halo Burger
 Harley Ellis Devereaux
 Haworth
 Henry the Hatter
 Henry Ford Hospital
 Heritage Guitars
 Herman Miller
 HopCat
 Hot 'n Now
 Howard Miller Clock Company
 Hungry Howie's Pizza

I
 Ilitch Holdings
 Image Space Incorporated
 Independent Bank

J
 Jiffy mix
 JSTOR
 Jet's Pizza

K
 Kalitta Air
 Keebler Company
 Kellogg's
 Kelly Services
 KLC Ann Arbor
 Koegel Meat Company

L
 La-Z-Boy
 Lake Michigan Credit Union
 LECO Corporation
 Lear Corporation
 Little Caesars

M
 Masco
 Meijer
 Merillat Industries
 Merit Network
 Meritor
 Michigan Sugar
 Miller, Canfield, Paddock and Stone
 Monroe Bank & Trust
 Moosejaw
 Morley Companies
 Motown Motion Picture Studios
 Mr. Handyman

N
 National Coney Island
 New Holland Brewing Company
 Northwest Broadcasting

O
 Old Orchard Brands
 Olympia Entertainment

P
 Palace Sports and Entertainment
 Penske Automotive Group
 Penske Corporation
 Perrigo
 The Planterra Conservatory
 Pro-Vision
 ProQuest

R
 R.L. Polk & Company
 Red Cedar Technology
 Rofin-Sinar
 Rocket Mortgage
 Roush Performance

S
 Schmohz
 Shelby Gem Factory
 SmithGroup
 Spartan Motors
 SpartanNash
 SS Badger
 Steelcase
 Stryker Corporation
 Superior Aviation

T
 Taubman Centers
 TCF Financial Corporation
 Tecumseh Products
 Tiara Yachts
 Tower International
 Towne Club
 Travel Adventures
 TRW Automotive
 Two Men and a Truck

U
 Universal Forest Products
 Upper Peninsula Power Company
 USA Jet Airlines

V
 Valassis
 Visteon
 VitaPerk

W
 Westborn Market
 Whirlpool Corporation
 William B. Eerdmans Publishing Company
 Williams International
 Wolverine World Wide

X
 X-Rite

Z
 Ziebart
 Zingerman's

Subsidiaries of US companies
 Campbell Ewald (subsidiary of The Interpublic Group of Companies)
 EOTech (subsidiary of L3Harris Technologies)
 Faygo (subsidiary of National Beverage)
 Gale (subsidiary of Cengage)
 General Dynamics Land Systems (subsidiary of General Dynamics)
 ProQuest (subsidiary of Cambridge Information Group)
 Warrior Sports (subsidiary of New Balance)
 Zondervan (subsidiary of HarperCollins)

Subsidiaries of foreign companies
 Detroit Diesel (subsidiary of Daimler AG)
 Jackson National Life (subsidiary of Prudential plc)
 Lason (subsidiary of HOV Services)

Companies formerly based in Michigan

A
 Affinia Group
 All Media Network
 American Specialty Cars
 Applicon
 Arbor Networks

B
 Bing Steel
 Budd Company

C
 Citizens Republic Bancorp
 Cobasys
 Con-way Freight
 Covansys Corporation

D
 Déjà Vu
 Delphi
 Dow Corning

E
 Energy Conversion Devices

F
 Family Christian Stores
 Felpausch

G
 The Geek Group
 Gerber Products Company
 Glen's Markets

H
 Hummer

K
 Keselowski Motorsports

L
 Lionel, LLC

N
 National Airlines

P
 Parisian
 Pioneer Surgical Technology
 Post Consumer Brands
 Post-Newsweek Stations
 PulteGroup

R
 Ramco-Gershenson Properties Trust
 Roths Industries

S
 Sterling Trucks
 Switch
 Syntel

W
 Weather Underground
 Western Star Trucks

See also
List of companies of the United States by state

Notes

Michigan

Companies